Daniel Křetínský (born 9 July 1975) is a Czech billionaire businessman and lawyer, who is the chief executive officer (CEO) and 94% owner of Energetický a průmyslový holding (EPH), the largest energy group in Central Europe, co-owner and president of football club AC Sparta Prague, and director and major shareholder of English football club West Ham United.

Early life
His father is Mojmír Křetínský, informatics professor at Masaryk University, and his mother, Michaela Židlická, is a former justice of the Constitutional Court of the Czech Republic.

He graduated from the faculty of law of Masaryk University and started to work as legal trainee in a law firm.

Career
In 1999, he joined J&T as lawyer and became a partner in 2003. Since 2004 he is chairman of football club AC Sparta Prague and he is believed to be its 40% shareholder.

When in 2009 J&T founded Energetický a průmyslový holding, he became its chairman and 20% shareholder. He ceased to be a partner of J&T. In 2011, he became chairman and 60% shareholder of EP Industries, that was divested from EPH. In 2016, he took 94% ownership of EPH through a series of transactions including EPH's sale of a 30% stake in subsidiary EPIF where the proceeds were used to buy out other shareholders. As of 2022, EPIF owned 49% of Eustream, a Slovak gas transmission system operator which piped Russian gas to central and eastern Europe.

From 2014, he is one of the owners of Czech media house Czech News Center, among others publisher of tabloid Blesk.

In October 2018, staff at Le Monde learned that Křetínský had purchased 49% of Matthieu Pigasse's stake in the company. Le Monde'''s Independency Group, a minority shareholder that aims to protect the paper's editorial independence, had not been informed of the sale, and asked Pigasse and Křetínský to sign an "approval agreement" that would give the Independency Group the right to approve or reject any controlling shareholder. , they had not done so.

On 12 March 2020, Jérôme Lefilliâtre, a French journalist, published Mister K, Petites et grandes affaires de Daniel Kretinsky'' (Le Seuil Editions), an investigative book about the Czech billionaire.

On 16 September 2020, his holding company Vesa Equity Investment Sarl announced a 3.05% holding interest in the shares of J Sainsbury plc, a major supermarket chain in the United Kingdom.

By November 2020, Křetínský's holding company Vesa Equity Investment Sarl also became the largest shareholder of Foot Locker.

On 10 November 2021, English football club West Ham United announced Křetínský and his colleague Pavel Horský had acquired 27% of the shares of the club, both becoming directors.

On 25 August 2022, Royal Mail in the United Kingdom was notified by the British government that Křetínský's Vesa Equity Investment Sarl, the then single largest investor of Royal Mail, had plans to increase its  shareholding to more than 25%. This triggered intervention and a British government review by Kwasi Kwarteng the United Kingdom's Secretary of State for Business under the National Security and Investment Act. On 31 October 2022, the Secretary of State for Business approved Křetínský's intention to increase Vesa's shareholding in Royal Mail (owned by parent company International Delivery Services).

Personal life
He is dating Anna Kellnerová, daughter of his business associate Petr Kellner who was the richest man in the country.

References 

Businesspeople from Brno
Czech billionaires
1975 births
21st-century Czech lawyers
Living people
Czech football chairmen and investors
Energetický a průmyslový holding
Masaryk University alumni
West Ham United F.C. directors and chairmen